A parody film or spoof film is a subgenre of comedy film that parodies other film genres or films as pastiches, works created by imitation of the style of many different films reassembled together.
Although the subgenre is often overlooked by critics, parody films are commonly profitable at the box office.

1900s 
Sherlock Holmes Baffled (1900)
The Little Train Robbery (1905) Clay (9) (2009)

1910s 
The Mystery of the Leaping Fish (1916)
Teddy at the Throttle (1917)

1920s 
Mud and Sand (1922)
Three Ages (1923)
Dr. Pyckle and Mr. Pryde (1925)
Yes, Yes, Nanette (1925)

1930s 
 Free and Easy (1930)
 Movie Crazy (1932)
 Number Seventeen (1932)
 Once in a Lifetime (1932)
 Sons of the Desert (1933)
 Babes in Toyland (1934)
 Satan Met a Lady (1936)
 The Man Who Was Sherlock Holmes (1937)
 Ali Baba Goes to Town (1937)
  Sh! The Octopus (1937)
 The Gorilla (1939)

1940s 
The Great Profile (1940)
You Nazty Spy! (1940)
A Chump at Oxford (1940)
Playmates (1941)
Hellzapoppin' (1941)
Crazy House (1943)
Along Came Jones (1945)
The Wistful Widow of Wagon Gap (1947)
Abbott and Costello Meet Frankenstein (1948)
Abbott and Costello Meet the Killer, Boris Karloff (1949)

1950s 
Abbott and Costello Meet the Invisible Man (1951)
Jack and the Beanstalk (1952)
Abbott and Costello Meet Dr. Jekyll and Mr. Hyde (1953)
Beat the Devil (1953)
Abbott and Costello Meet the Keystone Kops (1955)
Abbott and Costello Meet the Mummy (1955)
The Court Jester (1956)

1960s 
Creature from the Haunted Sea (1961)
Carry On Cleo (1964)
A Shot in the Dark (1964)
Doctor Strangelove (1964)
Carry On Spying (1964)
Harum Scarum (1965)
The Great Race (1965) 
Carry On Cowboy  (1965)
Don't Lose Your Head (1966)
For a Few Dollars Less (1966)
Carry On Screaming! (1966)
Our Man Flint (1966) 
Casino Royale (1967)
The Ambushers (1967)
The Dove (1968)
Zuckerkandl (1968)

1970s 

Carry On Up the Jungle (1970)
The Twelve Chairs (1970)
Carry On Henry (1971)
And Now for Something Completely Different (1971)
Carry On Dick (1974)
Blazing Saddles (1974) 
Flesh Gordon (1974)
Young Frankenstein (1974) 
The Groove Tube (1974)
Dark Star (1974)
Vampira (1974)
Uptown Saturday Night (1974)
Monty Python and the Holy Grail (1975) 
Love and Death (1975)
The Rocky Horror Picture Show (1975)
The Adventure of Sherlock Holmes' Smarter Brother (1975) 
The Black Bird (1975)
Allegro Non Troppo (1976)
Silent Movie (1976) 
Murder by Death (1976) 
Once Upon a Girl (1976)
Queen Kong (1976)
The Big Bus (1976)
High Anxiety (1977) 
The Kentucky Fried Movie (1977) 
American Raspberry (1977)
Hardware Wars (1978)
Attack of the Killer Tomatoes (1978)
The Cheap Detective (1978)
Carry On Emmannuelle (1978)
Piranha (1978) 
Monty Python's Life of Brian (1979)
Rock 'n' Roll High School (1979)

1980s 

Galaxina (1980)
Wholly Moses! (1980)
Airplane! (1980) 
Murder Can Hurt You (1980)
Caddyshack (1980)
The Private Eyes (1980)
Closet Cases of the Nerd Kind (1980)
History of the World, Part I (1981)
Under the Rainbow (1981)
Student Bodies (1981)
Saturday the 14th (1981)
Zorro, The Gay Blade (1981)
The Creature Wasn't Nice (1981)
Dead Men Don't Wear Plaid (1982)
Young Doctors in Love (1982)
Airplane II: The Sequel (1982) 
Police Squad! (TV series) (1982)
Pandemonium (1982)
The King of Comedy (1982)
Wacko (1982)
Zapped! (1982)
The Man With Two Brains (1983)
Monty Python's The Meaning of Life (1983)
Bullshot (1983)
Jaws 3-D (1983)
Agent 000 and the Deadly Curves (1983)
Bloodbath at the House of Death (1984)
Johnny Dangerously (1984)
Surf II: The End of the Trilogy (1984)
This Is Spinal Tap (1984)
The Toxic Avenger (1984)
Top Secret! (1984) 
The Zany Adventures of Robin Hood (1984)
Voyage of the Rock Aliens (1984)
Night of the Comet (1984)
Rustlers' Rhapsody (1985)
When Nature Calls (1985)
Clue (1985) 
Radioactive Dreams (1985)
Eat and Run (1986)
Haunted Honeymoon (1986)
Reform School Girls (1986)
Three Amigos (1986)
Whoops Apocalypse (1986)
Fresno (1986)
Evil Dead II (1987)
Hollywood Shuffle (1987)
Spaceballs (1987)
Back to the Beach (1987)
Amazon Women on the Moon (1987) 
Leonard Part 6 (1987)
Dragnet (1987)
Love at Stake (1987)
Return of the Killer Tomatoes (1988)
Ricky 1 (1988)
The Naked Gun: From the Files of Police Squad! (1988) 
The Adventures of Baron Munchausen (1988)
I'm Gonna Git You Sucka (1988)
Caddyshack II (1988)
Killer Klowns from Outer Space (1988)
Who Framed Roger Rabbit (1988)
Buster (1988)
Bill & Ted's Excellent Adventure (1989)
UHF (1989) 
Disorganized Crime (1989)
Lobster Man from Mars (1989)
Meet the Feebles (1989)
Transylvania Twist (1989)

1990s 

A Man Called Sarge (1990)
Flesh Gordon Meets the Cosmic Cheerleaders (1990)
The Adventures of Ford Fairlane (1990) 
Repossessed (1990)
Killer Tomatoes Strike Back (1990)
Mob Boss (1990)
Zapped Again! (1990)
The Freshman (1990)
If Looks Could Kill (1991)
The Naked Gun 2½: The Smell of Fear (1991) 
Bill & Ted's Bogus Journey (1991)
Hot Shots! (1991) 
Killer Tomatoes Eat France (1991)
Evil Toons (1992)
Carry On Columbus (1992)
Sister Act (1992)
Stay Tuned (1992)
Loaded Weapon 1 (1993)
CB4 (1993)
The Naked Truth (1993)
Hot Shots! Part Deux (1993)
Robin Hood: Men in Tights (1993) 
Fatal Instinct (1993)
Matinee (1993) 
Last Action Hero (1993)
Freaked (1993)
Sister Act 2: Back in the Habit (1993)
The Silence of the Hams (1994)
Naked Gun : The Final Insult (1994) 
Fear of a Black Hat (1994)
Blankman (1994)
The Brady Bunch Movie (1995)
Dracula: Dead and Loving It (1995)
Arabian Knight (1995)
Attack of the 60 Foot Centerfold (1995)
Don't Be a Menace to South Central While Drinking Your Juice in the Hood (1996)
The Cable Guy (1996)
A Very Brady Sequel (1996)
Cannibal! The Musical (1996) 
Spy Hard (1996)
High School High (1996)
Mystery Science Theater 3000: The Movie (1996)
Mars Attacks! (1996)  
Austin Powers: International Man of Mystery (1997) 
Funny Games (1997)
Starship Troopers (1997)
Orgazmo (1997)
George of the Jungle (1997)
Jane Austen's Mafia! (1998)
Wrongfully Accused (1998)
BASEketball (1998)
Plump Fiction (1998)
Liang Po Po: The Movie (1999)
Austin Powers: The Spy Who Shagged Me (1999)
Bowfinger (1999)
Galaxy Quest (1999)
The Underground Comedy Movie (1999)
The Woman Chaser (1999)
South Park: Bigger, Longer & Uncut (1999)
Drop Dead Gorgeous (1999)
The Scooby-Doo Project (1999)

2000s 

2001: A Space Travesty (2000)
Scary Movie (2000)
Charlie's Angels (2000) 
Shriek If You Know What I Did Last Friday the Thirteenth (2000)
The Bogus Witch Project (2000)
 The Tony Blair Witch Project (2000)
Scary Movie 2 (2001)
Not Another Teen Movie (2001)
Shrek (2001)
Shaolin Soccer (2001)
 Freddy Got Fingered (2001)
Elvira's Haunted Hills (2001)
Zoolander (2001) 
Wet Hot American Summer (2001)  
Kung Pow!: Enter the Fist (2002)  
The Master of Disguise (2002)                                                                                            
The Brady Bunch in the White House (2002)
The Powerpuff Girls Movie (2002)
Undercover Brother (2002) 
Ali G Indahouse (2002) 
Austin Powers in Goldmember (2002) 
Scary Movie 3 (2003)
Johnny English (2003)
Down with Love (2003) 
G-Sale (2003)
A Mighty Wind (2003)
George of the Jungle 2 (2003)
The Cat in the Hat (2003)
Lost Skeleton of Cadavra (2004)
Shaun of the Dead (2004)
Freak Out (2004)
Starsky & Hutch (2004)
Churchill: The Hollywood Years (2004)
Kung Fu Hustle (2004)
Shrek 2 (2004)
Club Dread (2004)
The SpongeBob SquarePants Movie (2004)
Team America: World Police (2004) 
The Producers (2005)
My Big Fat Independent Movie (2005)
The Hitchhiker's Guide to the Galaxy (2005)
Hoodwinked! (2005)
Date Movie (2006)
Scary Movie 4 (2006)
Another Gay Movie (2006)
18 Fingers of Death! (2006)
Borat (2006)
Barnyard (2006)
Doogal (2006)
Bikini Bloodbath (2006)
Man of the Year (2006)
Everything Other than Japan Sinks (2006)
Epic Movie (2007)
Farce of the Penguins (2007)
 Funny Games (2007)
Hot Fuzz (2007) 
The Comebacks (2007)
Walk Hard: The Dewey Cox Story (2007) 
The Naked Brothers Band: The Movie (2007)
Shrek the Third (2007)
Enchanted (2007)
Kill Buljo (2007)
You Don't Mess with the Zohan (2008)
Meet the Spartans (2008)
Superhero Movie (2008)
Another Gay Sequel: Gays Gone Wild (2008)
An American Carol (2008)
Disaster Movie (2008)
Extreme Movie (2008)
Tropic Thunder (2008)
The World Is Hot Enough (2008)
A.R.O.G. (2008)
Black Dynamite (2009)
Brüno (2009)
Dance Flick (2009)
OSS 117: Lost in Rio (2009)
Transylmania (2009)
Stan Helsing (2009)
Spanish Movie (2009)
Dark and Stormy Night (2009)
Alien Trespass (2009)
Cloudy with a Chance of Meatballs (2009)

2010s 

Thamizh Padam (2010)
MacGruber (2010)
Vampires Suck (2010)
Kick-Ass (2010)
Shrek Forever After (2010)
The 41-Year-Old Virgin Who Knocked Up Sarah Marshall and Felt Superbad About It (2010)
Johnny English Reborn (2011)
Hoodwinked Too! Hood vs. Evil (2011)
Breaking Wind (2012)
The Dictator (2012)
Movie 43 (2013)
iSteve (2013)
The Starving Games (2013)
A Haunted House (2013)
Scary Movie 5 (2013)
30 Nights of Paranormal Activity with the Devil Inside the Girl with the Dragon Tattoo (2013)
Inappropriate Comedy (2013)
Cloudy with a Chance of Meatballs 2 (2013)
This Is The End (2013)
Kick-Ass 2 (2013)
A Haunted House 2 (2014)
The Lego Movie (2014)
22 Jump Street (2014)
The Hungover Games (2014)
Hrudaya Kaleyam (2014)
They Came Together (2014)
Kingsman: The Secret Service (2014)
What We Do in the Shadows (2014)
The Interview (2014)
The SpongeBob Movie: Sponge Out of Water (2015)
Double Barrel (2015)
Chirakodinja Kinavukal (2015)
Superfast! (2015)
The Walking Deceased (2015)
Ted 2 (2015)
Tooken (2015)
Ridiculous 6  (2015)
Hotel Transylvania 2 (2015)
The Night Before (2015)
Deadpool (2016)
Fifty Shades of Black  (2016)
Donald Trump's The Art of the Deal: The Movie (2016)
Meet the Blacks (2016)
Popstar: Never Stop Never Stopping (2016)
Sausage Party (2016)
The Lego Batman Movie (2017)
Kingsman: The Golden Circle (2017)
Hotel Transylvania 3: Summer Vacation (2018)
Teen Titans Go! To the Movies (2018)
Deadpool 2 (2018)
 Thamizh Padam 2.0 (2018)
 Johnny English Strikes Again (2018)
 Holmes & Watson (2018)
 Notzilla (2019)
 The Lego Movie 2: The Second Part (2019)
 Between Two Ferns: The Movie (2019)
 Teen Titans Go! vs. Teen Titans (2019)

2020s 
 Eurovision Song Contest: The Story of Fire Saga (2020)
Borat Subsequent Moviefilm (2020)
 Bill & Ted Face the Music (2020)
 Secret Magic Control Agency (2021)
 America: The Motion Picture (2021)
 Hotel Transylvania: Transformania (2022)
 Paws of Fury: The Legend of Hank (2022)
 Weird: The Al Yankovic Story (2022)

References

Film genres